Herbert Richard Lambert, FRPS, (1882– 7 March 1936, 53–54 years of age at time of death) was a British portrait photographer known for his portrayals of professional musicians and composers including Gustav Holst.

In 1923 he published Modern British Composers: Seventeen Portraits in collaboration with Sir Eugene Goossens, and in 1926, he became managing director of the Elliott & Fry portrait studio. In 1930, he published Studio portrait lighting, a technical guidebook. He is also responsible for salvaging much of the 19th-century photography of Henry Fox Talbot, by re-photographing the remains of Talbot's photographs.

In addition to photography, Lambert was also an amateur maker of musical instruments, specialising in harpsichords and clavichords.
In 1927, he lent a clavichord which he had built to Herbert Howells; Howells used it to compose a 12-piece collection, which he named "Lambert's Clavichord".

Howells also introduced Lambert to Gerald Finzi, whose 1936 Interlude for oboe & string quartet, Op. 21 was inspired by Lambert.

A Quaker, Lambert was imprisoned as a conscientious objector during the First World War. He lived in Combe Down, Bath, Somerset.

References

External links
Npg.org.uk

1882 births
1936 deaths
Artists from Bath, Somerset
Photographers from Somerset
British conscientious objectors
British Quakers
20th-century British photographers
20th-century Quakers